Tischeria martinkrugeri is a moth of the family Tischeriidae. It is known from South Africa.

References

Endemic moths of South Africa
Tischeriidae
Moths of Africa
Moths described in 2003